Kept is a reality television series that centered on Jerry Hall (model and ex-wife to Mick Jagger) searching for a kept man. The show premiered on the American cable network VH1 in late May 2005. When Hall narrowed the list down to twelve, she spirited them off to London and eliminated them one by one.

The final three consisted of Anwar, Austen and Seth. In the August 4 finale, Hall was torn between Austen and Seth but ultimately chose Seth as he knew how to have fun and she thought he had matured throughout the process. Seth claims that he got his $100,000 in prize money but after filming stopped he never saw Jerry, the penthouse apartment, or the Lamborghini again.

Contestants 

 Seth Frye
 Austen Earl
 Jon Benarroch
 Brian Bergdoll
 Mike Biloto
 Maurizio Farhad
 Jason Fromer
 Anwar Jenkins
 Jeanne Marine
 Ricardo Medina, Jr.
 Devonric Johnson
 Mike Piloto
 Frank Trigg
 Slavco Tuskaloski

Controversy
The show, when aired in the United Kingdom on the channel VH1 UK, caused a small controversy when adverts were banned from London Underground stations. The posters in question depicted Jerry Hall holding a leash, surrounded by several young semi-dressed men, and this violated London Underground's policy of adverts featuring people as sex objects. However, the posters were on display in other locations including mainline railway stations.

References

External links
 
 

2005 American television series debuts
2005 American television series endings
2000s American reality television series
VH1 original programming
American dating and relationship reality television series
English-language television shows